Paul Platz  (July 28, 1920 – November 8, 2012) was a Canadian ice hockey left winger who played on three provincial championships with the Winnipeg Monarchs. He was born in Winnipeg, Manitoba.

Awards and achievements
USHL Championship (1946)
“Honoured Member” of the Manitoba Hockey Hall of Fame

External links

Paul Platz’s biography at Manitoba Hockey Hall of Fame

1920 births
2012 deaths
Canadian ice hockey left wingers
Ice hockey people from Winnipeg
Winnipeg Monarchs players